The Lifan Foison or Lifan Fengshun (丰顺) is a five- to eight-seater Microvan made by Lifan Group, the Chinese automaker. Introduced in 2011, the Lifan Foison range is based on the earlier LF6361 series which is related to the 1999 Daihatsu Atrai.

Overview 

A total of 12 trim levels of the Lifan Foison is available in China, and the engine options includes a 1.0 liter producing 53 hp and a 1.3 liter producing 68 hp.

Prices of the Lifan Foison ranges from 32,800 yuan to 49,380 yuan before the discontinuation in the Chinese market.

References

Microvans
Cars introduced in 2011
2020s cars
Foison
Cars of China